Petr Jirmus (born 26 December 1957) is a Czech pilot. He is notable for his achievements as an aerobatic pilot, winning the FAI World Aerobatic Championships in 1984 and 1986, being two-time winner of the FAI European Aerobatic Championships (in 1983 and 1985). In 1985, he was voted Sportsperson of the Year (Czechoslovakia). Since 2000, Jirmus was flying commercially for Travel Service Airlines.

References 

Aerobatic pilots
Czech aviators
1957 births
Living people